Mini is a genus of tiny microhylid frogs that are endemic to southeastern Madagascar where they live among leaf litter in lowland forests. The three species and the genus itself were only scientifically described in 2019; although not yet rated by the IUCN, they have very small ranges and it has been recommended that two qualify as critically endangered and M. ature as data deficient.

They were formerly confused with Stumpffia, another genus of tiny frogs from Madagascar. All are well-camouflaged brown frogs.

Species 
There are currently 3 species:

 Mini ature Scherz et al., 2019
 Mini mum Scherz et al., 2019
 Mini scule Scherz et al., 2019

References 

Cophylinae
Amphibian genera
Endemic frogs of Madagascar
Taxa named by Mark D. Scherz
Taxa named by Andolalao Rakotoarison
Taxa named by Angelica Crottini